Not in Our Name is a jazz album by bassist Charlie Haden, recorded in 2004 and released by Verve Records in 2005.

The album is the fourth by Haden's Liberation Music Orchestra, the follow-up to Dream Keeper (1990).

Reception 
The Penguin Guide to Jazz wrote that "It's respectful but with a certain impatience over the routine sentimentalization of these lovely tunes, particularly at a time when the country is again at war."

Track listing 
"Not in our Name" (Charlie Haden) – 6:19
"This is Not America" (Pat Metheny, Lyle Mays, David Bowie) – 6:39
"Blue Anthem" (Bley) – 7:49
"America the Beautiful" (Medley) – 16:54
"America the Beautiful" (Samuel A. Ward)
"America the Beautiful" (Gary McFarland)
"Lift Every Voice and Sing" (James Weldon Johnson, J. Rosamond Johnson)
"Skies of America" (Ornette Coleman)
"Amazing Grace" (John Newton / traditional) – 7:12
"Goin' Home" (Antonín Dvořák) – 7:49
"Throughout" (Bill Frisell) – 8:55
"Adagio" (Samuel Barber) – 7:20

Personnel 
Charlie Haden – bass
Carla Bley – piano, arranger, conductor
Michael Rodriguez – trumpet
Seneca Black – trumpet
Curtis Fowlkes – trombone
Ahnee Sharon Freeman – French horn
Joe Daley – tuba
Miguel Zenón – alto saxophone
Chris Cheek – tenor saxophone
Tony Malaby – flute, tenor saxophone
Steve Cardenas – guitar
Matt Wilson – drums

References 

2005 albums
Charlie Haden albums
Liberation Music Orchestra albums
Verve Records albums